The Point of Hellia is a headland on the northwest coast of the Orkney Mainland, Scotland. This landform extends into the southern part of Eynhallow Sound, a seaway of the North Sea.

Gurness, an Iron Age broch promontory fort, is situated on the Point of Hellia. According to Hogan, the drystone construction of the "round tower fort is flanked by a number of ancillary structures and impressive concentric ditch and rampart outer defences; moreover, the rocky shoreline cliffs posed a formidable approach for marine invaders."

References

See also
 Evie, Orkney
 Sands of Evie

Landforms of Orkney
Hellia
Mainland, Orkney